Jonathan Crow is the Toronto Symphony Orchestra's concertmaster and a violinist in the New Orford String Quartet.

In 2005 Jonathan Crow joined the Schulich School of Music at McGill University as Assistant Professor of Violin and was appointed Associate Professor of Violin in 2010. He is currently Associate Professor of Violin at the University of Toronto, Faculty of Music.

Crow was born in Prince George, British Columbia. He plays a 1738 del Gesù violin.

Notes 

University of Toronto Faculty of Music Biography
Jonathan Crow TSO biography
Jonathan Crow Centre d'arts Orford biography

Concertmasters
Canadian classical violinists
Male classical violinists
People from Prince George, British Columbia
Living people
Year of birth missing (living people)
Place of birth missing (living people)
21st-century classical violinists
21st-century Canadian male musicians
Academic staff of McGill University
21st-century Canadian violinists and fiddlers
Canadian male violinists and fiddlers